Sam ("Rocky") Rukundo (born May 18, 1980 in Kampala) is a boxer from Uganda, who competed at the 2004 Summer Olympics for his native African country. There he was stopped in the quarterfinals of the lightweight  (– 60 kg) division by Russia's Murat Khrachev.

Rukundo qualified for the 2004 Athens Games by ending up in second place at the 2nd AIBA African 2004 Olympic Qualifying Tournament in Gaborone, Botswana. In the final he was defeated by Mauritius' Michael Medor.

After representing his native country at the Athens Olympics, Rukundo decided to turn pro, under the training of James Cook, and under the management of Mickey Helliet. He made his debut on the September 4 the same year, and moved to Sweden to improve as a professional fighter.

He has been African lightweight champion.

Professional boxing record

External links

Sam's official website www.samrocky.com

References
sports-reference

1980 births
Olympic boxers of Uganda
Living people
Boxers at the 2004 Summer Olympics
Sportspeople from Kampala
Lightweight boxers
Ugandan male boxers
African Boxing Union champions
Ugandan emigrants to Sweden
Sportspeople from Uppsala